Mangshi River also called Mangshi Large River, is a river in western Yunnan, mainly in the territory of Mangshi City. It is the largest tributary river of Shweli River in China, which is a tributary river of Irrawaddy. The source of Mangshi River is at Longxin Township in Longling County, Baoshan, and the upper also called Bawan River. Mangshi River flow through the west fields of Mangshi city, and it flow in Shweli River at Gazhong Village in Zhefang Town. It is the mother river of Mangshi. The length of Mangshi River is 117.1 km, and the basin size is 1,881 km², about 61.3% of area of Mangshi City.

References

Rivers of Yunnan
Geography of Dehong Dai and Jingpo Autonomous Prefecture
Geography of Baoshan, Yunnan
Mangshi